Creston is an unincorporated community in Natchitoches Parish, Louisiana, United States. Creston is not included in the 2010 United States Census. The community is part of the Natchitoches Micropolitan Statistical Area.

Creston is a fishing community on Black Lake, a large waterway full of cypress trees. There is moss on many area trees. A new concrete bridge carries traffic on Louisiana State Highway 9 over the lake. The previous wooden bridge was dismantled.

Area businesses include Bell's Camp, established in 1936, and the Sea and Sirloin Restaurant, which opened in 1983.

Creston Baptist Church is located at the intersections of the state highways leading to Ashland, Goldonna, and Readhimer.

Among the pioneer families in Creston are Perot, Trichel, Pardee, Dortlon, and Desadier. They trace their origins to the 1720s with the marriage in Mobile, Alabama, of a Chitimacha Indian slave, Marie Theresa De La Grande Terre, originally from Lafourche Parish in south Louisiana, and a French military officer, Jacques Guedon.

References

Unincorporated communities in Natchitoches Parish, Louisiana
Unincorporated communities in Louisiana
Populated places in Ark-La-Tex